Shaban ul millat Ali Murtaza bayabani  (1261 – 1359), also known as  Mahi-Shaban i Bayabani, was a Sufi born at Bhakkar, Sind, on 24 Shaban 630 H (in 660/1261 AD, according to the Tahrir al mu'taqid). He was Bhaakri Syed and wali (Friend of Allah by birth) and appointed as Abdal by his father in his early age. He traveled at the age of thirty to Multan, whence he moved successively to Bihar, Shaikhpura (India) and finally to the neighbourhood of Allahabad, (India) where large numbers of people became his followers and accepted the Islam. He stayed there and made it the seat of spirituality and knowledge.

He died on 3 or 13 Dhul Hijjah 760 (26 October or 5 Nov 1359 AD) at jhunsi (according to tahrir al mutaqid) and his Shrine is located in Jhunsi Allahabad.

Early life
Shaban ul millat Ali Murtaza was born on 24 Shaban 630 H  660/1261 AD at bhakkar and his father name is Sayyid Shah Badruddin badr e-alam [according to the Tahrir al mu'taqid]. He was descendant of Ali. In his late twenties he started his journey in search of spiritual master and went to many places including Multan where he met with Shams-uddin[detail] and requested to make him his disciple. On hearing this Shamsuddin replied that i don't have your destiny i teaches jazb where as in your destiny there a Wilaya. He instructed shaban ul millat to go and meet Makhdoom Ruknuddin abu al fatah. Manba Al-ansab

Shaban ul millat presented himself in the service of Makhdoom Ruknuddin abu al-fatah and stayed there with makhdoom Ruknuddin abu al fatah bin shah sadr-uddin bin Makhdoom Bahauddin Zakariya Multani for two years. He wanted from makhdoom Ruknuddin to takes is bayt (oath) but makhdomm Ruknuddin replied that your destiny is in Bihar (India) go there and give the bayt to Makhdoom minhajuddin Haji harmain.
Shaban ul millat ali murtaza departed from multan and went bihar where he gives his bayt to Makhdoom haji harmain and became the Sufi of Soharwardi order. He passed on 3 or 13 Dhul Hijjah 760/ 26 October or 5 November 1359[at jhunsi according to tahrir al mutaqid]. His Shrine was located in Jhunsi Allahabad.

References

1261 births
1359 deaths
People from Sindh
Spirituality
Sufis